The 2008 Arkansas Twisters season was the franchise's ninth season as a football franchise in the arenafootball2 league. The National Conference team, led by head coach Chris Siegfried, played their home games on Allstate Field at Alltel Arena in North Little Rock, Arkansas. The Diamonds finished the 2008 regular season with an 11–5 record and 2nd place in the Central Division. The team's playoff run ended in the first round with a 55–68 loss to the Central Valley Coyotes.

Off-field moves
2008 was the team's second season in the Central Division of the National Conference. Other teams in the Central Division this season were the Amarillo Dusters, Lubbock Renegades, Oklahoma City Yard Dawgz, and Tulsa Talons.

The Twisters hired new head coach Chris Siegfried. He had previously served as the head coach of the Spokane Shock in 2006. Siegfied would lead the team to a winning record (including a franchise record seven consecutive wins) and a short playoff run this season and return in 2009.

Roster moves
Twisters players picked up post-season honors from the AF2 coaches and press. Quarterback Kyle Rowley was selected as the Schutt Offensive Player of the Year. Wide receiver Chris Denney was named Cutters Playmaker of the Year.

Schedule

Regular season

Playoffs

References

External links
2008 Arkansas Twisters Team History at ArenaFan.com
Texas Revolution official website

Arkansas Twisters seasons
Arkansas Twisters
2008 Arena Football League season
football